Kuroshioturris nipponica is a species of sea snail, a marine gastropod mollusk in the family Turridae, the turrids.

Description
The length of the shell attains 8 mm.

Distribution
This marine species occurs off Japan and the Philippines at depths between 100 m and 1445 m.

References

 Shuto T. (1961). Conacean gastropods from the Miyazaki Group (Paleontological study of the Miyazaki Group-IX). Memoirs of the Faculty of Science, Kyushu University, series D, Geology. 11(2): 71-150, pls 3-10.
 Higo, S., Callomon, P. & Goto, Y. (1999) Catalogue and Bibliography of the Marine Shell-Bearing Mollusca of Japan. Elle Scientific Publications, Yao, Japan, 749 p
 Kantor, Yuri I., Alexander Fedosov, and Nicolas Puillandre. "New and unusual deep-water Conoidea revised with shell, radula and DNA characters." Ruthenica 28.2 (2018).

External links
  Tucker, J.K. 2004 Catalog of recent and fossil turrids (Mollusca: Gastropoda). Zootaxa 682:1-1295
 Gastropods.com: Kuroshioturris nipponica

nipponica
Gastropods described in 1961